The Thirty-Nine Steps is a 1915 novel by John Buchan.

The 39 Steps may also refer to:

Adaptations of the novel
 The 39 Steps (1935 film), directed by Alfred Hitchcock
 The 39 Steps (1959 film), directed by Ralph Thomas 
 The Thirty Nine Steps (1978 film), directed by Don Sharp
 The 39 Steps (2008 film), directed by James Hawes
 The 39 Steps (play), a parody by Patrick Barlow
 The 39 Steps (video game), 2013

Other uses
 39 Steps (album), by guitarist John Abercrombie, 2013
 39 Steps (Ariolasoft), an imprint of Ariolasoft, a video game publisher